John Creking (died ca. 1405), of Canterbury, Kent, was an English politician.

Family
Creking was married to a woman named Alice; they had two sons.

Career
Creking was a Member of Parliament for Canterbury constituency in October 1377, 1378, 1385 and September 1388.

References

Year of birth missing
1400s deaths
14th-century births
English MPs October 1377
People from Canterbury
English MPs 1378
English MPs 1385
English MPs September 1388